Football in Kazakhstan is governed by the national body the Football Federation of Kazakhstan. The FFK organises the men's, women's and futsal national teams. Football is the most popular sport in the country, followed by ice hockey.

History

Kazakh football first appeared in Semey before World War I, when British merchants brought the game to the area. Among the early players of the game was writer Mukhtar Auezov who turned out for the 'Yarysh' club, the biggest of the time . Teams soon followed in Pavlodar and Dzhambul, before the first official appearance of a Kazakh SSR representative team in 1928. By the 1930s Kazakh club sides were regularly participating in the lower ranks of Soviet football.

After World War II a regular league began in 1946 while a cup competition, previously held sporadically was instituted full-time in 1948. A permanent Kazakh SSR Football Federation was established in 1959. Leading club side FC Kairat Almaty went on to make history in 1960 by becoming the first Kazakh side to compete in the Soviet Top League and made further history in 1963 by reaching the semi-finals of the Soviet Cup, the best performance by a Kazakh team in the competition. They would go on to record Kazakhstan's first triumph in the Soviet First League in 1976.

No Kazakh footballer had represented the USSR until 1977 when FC Kairat defender Seilda Baishakov made his debut in a FIFA World Cup qualifier against Hungary. Later, in 1986, his club would go on to add further to their honours by finishing seventh in the Top League, an all-time best finish for a Kazakh club. The country's Eugeny Yarovenko also added to the honours as a member of the victorious Soviet side at the 1988 Summer Olympics.

After the fall of the Soviet Union, a Football Association of the Republic of Kazakhstan was set up in 1992 and soon accepted into FIFA and the Asian Football Confederation. The national team debuted soon afterwards and individual Kazakh competitions were established. The renamed FFK went on to join UEFA in 2002, ending their relationship with the AFC.

Domestic competition
The main league competition in the country is the Kazakhstan Premier League, formed in 1992 from Zone 8 of the Third Level of Soviet football with other higher placed Kazakh clubs co-opted. A first division was added in 1994 and this competition is now organised on a regional basis and is fed into by a further regionalised second division. The Kazakhstan Cup is also competed for, while successful clubs gain entry to the early rounds of the UEFA Champions League and the UEFA Europa League.

League system

National team

Although they participated in matches against other Republics of the Soviet Union, the Kazakhstan team did not make their official debut as an independent country until 1 June 1992, when they defeated Turkmenistan 1–0. Based at the Almaty Central Stadium, they have yet to qualify for a major tournament.

Champions during Soviet era (1936–91)
A Kazakh SSR championship was founded in 1936 with no Kazakh clubs competing in the Soviet Top League. The winners of this competition were:

1936–81

1980–81. Zone 7, 3rd level of Soviet football, including Kazakhstan and other Central Asian teams
 1980 – Traktor Pavlodar
 1981 – Aktyubinets Aktobe

1982–91. Zone 8, 3rd level of Soviet football, including only Kazakhstan teams
 1982 – Shakhter Karagandy
 1983 – Shakhter Karagandy
 1984 – Tselinnik Tselinograd
 1985 – Meliorator Shymkent
 1986 – Meliorator Shymkent
 1987 – Meliorator Shymkent
 1988 – Traktor Pavlodar
 1989 – Traktor Pavlodar
 1990 – Vostok Oskemen
 1991 – Aktyubinets Aktobe

See also
Sport in Kazakhstan

References

External links
Official Kazakhstan Football Federation website